Antakya Sport Hall is an indoor sporting arena that is located in Hatay, Turkey. It belongs to Hatay Youth and Sports Directorate. The capacity of the sport hall is 2,500 spectators.

Professional women basketball team Homend Antakya play their home games in Antakya Sport Hall.

Basketball venues in Turkey
Sport in Antakya
Sport venues in Hatay